Sandra Kay Descher (born November 30, 1945) is an American former child actress of the 1950s.

Life and career
Born November 30, 1945, in Burbank, California, Descher is the daughter of Mr. and Mrs. Fred Descher. She has a younger brother, Michael. She attended North Hollywood High School. 

In 1954, a news item reported that Descher was "the only long-term contract child in Hollywood," having been signed by Metro-Goldwyn-Mayer.

That same year, she appeared in her favorite film, The Last Time I Saw Paris. Based on F. Scott Fitzgerald's short story Babylon Revisited, she played Vicky, the daughter of Van Johnson and Elizabeth Taylor. After her mother dies, Vicky is adopted by her mother's sister, played by Donna Reed. The movie called on her to speak French and to dance ballet. In 1954, she also played a crippled child in a Martin and Lewis film. In 1954 she also played the little girl in the opening scene of Them!, the movie about giant ants starring Edmund Gwenn, James Arness and James Whitmore. In 1955, she was in The Prodigal with Lana Turner. Then she played Gregory Peck's 10-year-old daughter in The Man in the Gray Flannel Suit.

Descher also played the little girl, Susan Walker, daughter of Doris Walker, played by Teresa Wright in the 1955 holiday special version of  Miracle on 34th Street.  It also starred Macdonald Carey as Fred Gaily, the attorney who represented Kris Kringle, played by Thomas Mitchell.

In 1956, she played June Allyson's daughter Debbie in The Opposite Sex, a musical remake of The Women (1939). She appeared in another movie with Van Johnson that year, The Bottom of the Bottle (1956). She also guest-starred in The Adventures of Ozzie and Harriet as the title character of the 1965 TV episode titled "Kris' Girlfriend", where she played Sally. Around this time, she guest-starred with Ann Doran in the Western series My Friend Flicka, and on the Cold War drama series, Crusader. She guest-starred as the daughter of a sea captain in an episode of Wagon Train.

Her last movie, at the age of 12, was the cult favorite The Space Children (1958). In 1959, she appeared in the episode "Dark Morning" of CBS's anthology series, The DuPont Show with June Allyson. She guest-starred on The Real McCoys. In 1961, she appeared in the first season of My Three Sons, as Elizabeth Martin, a love interest for Robbie Douglas (Don Grady) in episode 32, "The Musician", and in 1964 again as Robbie's love interest in season five as Marjorie in episode 13 "You're in My Power".

Descher also appeared in a recurring role as Judy Massey, a daughter of the Loretta Young character, Christine Massey, in the CBS family drama, The New Loretta Young Show (1962–63). She played Susanna in The Donna Reed Show, and Susan, the daughter of Elena Verdugo's character of Audrey, in 1964 in CBS's sitcom The New Phil Silvers Show. Her final television role was in 1966 when she appeared on Perry Mason as Sherry Lawler in "The Case of the Avenging Angel".

References

Further reading
 
 Best, Marc. Those Endearing Young Charms: Child Performers of the Screen (South Brunswick and New York: Barnes & Co., 1971), pp. 68–73.

External links

20th-century American actresses
Living people
American film actresses
American television actresses
American child actresses
Actresses from California
People from Burbank, California
Metro-Goldwyn-Mayer contract players
North Hollywood High School alumni
21st-century American women
1945 births